This is a list of species in the kleptoparasitic bee genus Triepeolus.

Species

 Triepeolus aguilari Moure, 1955
 Triepeolus alvarengai Moure, 1955
 Triepeolus ancoratus Cockerell, 1916
 Triepeolus antiguensis Cockerell, 1949
 Triepeolus antiochensis Rightmyer, 2008
 Triepeolus argentimus Rightmyer, 2008
 Triepeolus argus Rightmyer, 2008
 Triepeolus argyreus (Cockerell, 1907)
 Triepeolus atoconganus Moure, 1955
 Triepeolus atripes Mitchell, 1962
 Triepeolus aztecus (Cresson, 1878)
 Triepeolus balteatus Cockerell, 1921
 Triepeolus bihamatus (Cockerell, 1907)
 Triepeolus bilineatus Cockerell, 1949
 Triepeolus bilunatus Cockerell, 1949
 Triepeolus bimorulus Rightmyer, 2008
 Triepeolus blaisdelli Cockerell & Sandhouse, 1924
 Triepeolus brittaini Cockerell, 1931
 Triepeolus brunnescens Cockerell & Sandhouse, 1924
 Triepeolus buchwaldi (Friese, 1908)
 Triepeolus californicus (Cresson, 1878)
 Triepeolus callopus Cockerell, 1905
 Triepeolus cameroni (Meade-Waldo, 1913)
 Triepeolus charlesi Rightmyer, 2008
 Triepeolus circumculus Rightmyer, 2008
 Triepeolus claytoni Rightmyer, 2008
 Triepeolus concavus (Cresson, 1878)
 Triepeolus cressonii (Robertson, 1897)
 Triepeolus cruciformis Rightmyer, 2008
 Triepeolus cuabitensis Genaro, 1999
 Triepeolus cuneatus Cockerell, 1917
 Triepeolus custeri Cockerell, 1926
 Triepeolus cyclurus Cockerell, 1923
 Triepeolus dacotensis (Stevens, 1919)
 Triepeolus denverensis Cockerell, 1910
 Triepeolus diffusus Rightmyer, 2008
 Triepeolus dilutus Rightmyer, 2008
 Triepeolus distinctus (Cresson, 1878)
 Triepeolus diversipes Cockerell, 1924
 Triepeolus donatus (Smith, 1854)
 Triepeolus edwardi Rightmyer, 2008
 Triepeolus eldoradensis (Cockerell, 1910)
 Triepeolus eliseae 
 Triepeolus engeli Rightmyer, 2008
 Triepeolus epeolurus Rightmyer, 2004
 Triepeolus exilicurvus Rightmyer, 2008
 Triepeolus flavigradus Rightmyer, 2008
 Triepeolus flavipennis (Friese, 1917)
 Triepeolus fraserae Cockerell, 1904
 Triepeolus fulgidus Rightmyer, 2008
 Triepeolus georgicus Mitchell, 1962
 Triepeolus grandis (Friese, 1917)
 Triepeolus grindeliae Cockerell, 1907
 Triepeolus griswoldi Rightmyer, 2008
 Triepeolus haematurus Cockerell & Sandhouse, 1924
 Triepeolus helianthi (Robertson, 1897)
 Triepeolus hopkinsi Cockerell, 1905
 Triepeolus interruptus Rightmyer, 2008
 Triepeolus intrepidus (Smith, 1879)
 Triepeolus inyoensis Cockerell & Sandhouse, 1924
 Triepeolus isocomae Cockerell, 1904
 Triepeolus isohedrus Rightmyer, 2008
 Triepeolus jennieae Rightmyer, 2008
 Triepeolus joliae Rightmyer, 2008
 Triepeolus junctus Mitchell, 1962
 Triepeolus kathrynae Rozen, 1989
 Triepeolus lateralis Rightmyer, 2008
 Triepeolus laticaudus Cockerell, 1921
 Triepeolus laticeps (Friese, 1917)
 Triepeolus lectiformis (Cockerell, 1925)
 Triepeolus loomisorum Rozen, 1989
 Triepeolus lunatus (Say, 1824)
 Triepeolus lusor Cockerell, 1925
 Triepeolus margaretae Rightmyer, 2008
 Triepeolus martini (Cockerell, 1900)
 Triepeolus mauropygus Rightmyer, 2008
 Triepeolus medusa Cockerell, 1917
 Triepeolus melanarius Rightmyer, 2008
 Triepeolus mensae Cockerell, 1924
 Triepeolus metatarsalis (Friese, 1921)
 Triepeolus mexicanus (Cresson, 1878)
 Triepeolus micheneri Rightmyer, 2008
 Triepeolus michiganensis Mitchell, 1962
 Triepeolus micropygius Robertson, 1903
 Triepeolus mitchelli Hurd, 1979
 Triepeolus mojavensis Linsley, 1939
 Triepeolus monardae Mitchell, 1962
 Triepeolus nayaritensis Rightmyer, 2008
 Triepeolus nemoralis (Holmberg, 1886)
 Triepeolus nevadensis (Cresson, 1878)
 Triepeolus nigrihirtus Mitchell, 1962
 Triepeolus nisibonensis Genaro, 2001
 Triepeolus norae Cockerell, 1907
 Triepeolus obliteratus Graenicher, 1911
 Triepeolus occidentalis (Cresson, 1878)
 Triepeolus osiriformis (Schrottky, 1910)
 Triepeolus pacis Cockerell, 1925
 Triepeolus paenepectoralis Viereck, 1905
 Triepeolus parkeri Rightmyer, 2008
 Triepeolus partitus Rightmyer, 2008
 Triepeolus parvidiversipes Rightmyer, 2008
 Triepeolus parvus Rightmyer, 2008
 Triepeolus pectoralis (Robertson, 1897)
 Triepeolus penicilliferus (Brues, 1903)
 Triepeolus permixtus (Cockerell, 1923)
 Triepeolus perpictus Rightmyer, 2008
 Triepeolus phaeopygus Rightmyer, 2008
 Triepeolus pomonalis Cockerell, 1916
 Triepeolus punctoclypeus Rightmyer, 2008
 Triepeolus quadratus Rightmyer, 2008
 Triepeolus quadrifasciatus (Say, 1823)
 Triepeolus remigatus (Fabricius, 1804)
 Triepeolus rhododontus Cockerell, 1921
 Triepeolus robustus (Cresson, 1878)
 Triepeolus rohweri Cockerell, 1911
 Triepeolus roni Genaro, 1999
 Triepeolus rufithorax Graenicher, 1928
 Triepeolus rufoclypeus (Fox, 1891)
 Triepeolus rufotegularis (Ashmead, 1900)
 Triepeolus rugosus Mitchell, 1962
 Triepeolus rugulosus (Cockerell, 1917)
 Triepeolus sarothrinus (Cockerell, 1929)
 Triepeolus saturninus Cockerell & Sandhouse, 1924
 Triepeolus scelestus (Cresson, 1878)
 Triepeolus schwarzi Cockerell, 1921
 Triepeolus segregatus (Cockerell, 1900)
 Triepeolus sequior Cockerell, 1921
 Triepeolus simplex Robertson, 1903
 Triepeolus simulatus Rightmyer, 2008
 Triepeolus subalpinus Cockerell, 1910
 Triepeolus sublunatus Cockerell, 1907
 Triepeolus subnitens Cockerell & Timberlake, 1929
 Triepeolus tanneri Cockerell, 1928
 Triepeolus tepanecus (Cresson, 1878)
 Triepeolus texanus (Cresson, 1878)
 Triepeolus timberlakei Cockerell, 1929
 Triepeolus totonacus (Cresson, 1878)
 Triepeolus townsendi Cockerell, 1907
 Triepeolus tristis (Smith, 1854)
 Triepeolus utahensis (Cockerell, 1921)
 Triepeolus ventralis (Meade-Waldo, 1913)
 Triepeolus verbesinae (Cockerell, 1897)
 Triepeolus vernus Rightmyer, 2008
 Triepeolus vicinus (Cresson, 1865)
 Triepeolus victori Genaro, 1998
 Triepeolus warriti Rightmyer, 2008
 Triepeolus wilsoni (Cresson, 1865)
 Triepeolus zacatecus (Cresson, 1878)

References

Nomadinae